Gaana Rajas is a Gaana dance group. They came to the semi-finals of Got to Dance.

History 
Gaana Rajas was formed by people aged between 21 and 27, who met while participating in university dance competitions.
The group were contestants in the dance reality show Got to Dance in 2012.
They performed at the Under the Stars event in Newham in 2013.

Members 
Gaana Rajas was made of 10 members when they competed in Got to Dance in 2012.
 Jeya Raveendran
 Prito Itiacandy
 Tivyan Wigneswaran
 Mayuri Vijay
 Neethu Haridas
 Vidhya Yogarajah
 Rakhee Visavadia 
 Rajni Ghir

References 

Dance groups
Reality dancing competition contestants
Performing groups established in 2012